Deh-e Bala (also Romanized as Deh-e Bālā and Deh Bālā) is a village in Kuhestan Rural District, Jazmurian District, Rudbar-e Jonubi County, Kerman Province, Iran. At the 2006 census, its population was 95, in 30 families.

References 

Populated places in Rudbar-e Jonubi County